François-Théodore Savoie (February 14, 1846 – September 9, 1921) was a Canadian politician.

He was elected to the House of Commons of Canada for the Quebec electoral district of Mégantic in the 1904 federal election. A Liberal, he was re-elected in 1908. In 1915, he was appointed to the Legislative Council of Quebec for the Kennebec Division. He died while in office in 1921.

References
 
 

1846 births
1921 deaths
Liberal Party of Canada MPs
Members of the House of Commons of Canada from Quebec
Quebec Liberal Party MLCs